Bounty Girls: Miami was a Court TV show that features licensed female bail bond agents that track down and apprehend local fugitives. The women work for Sunshine State Bail Bonds. The show aired on the former Court TV in 2007, with only 9 episodes. After its Court TV run, these episodes were aired on Investigation Discovery in the United States, and on the Crime & Investigation Network in Australia and New Zealand.

External links

2007 American television series debuts
2007 American television series endings
2000s American reality television series
Television shows set in Miami